New Jersey Copa FC are an American pro-am soccer club fielded by the soccer/football academy FC Copa Academy from Metuchen, New Jersey. It was founded in 2004 and fields men's, women's, and youth teams in a number of different amateur and semi-professional leagues, in addition to yearly academy teams which compete in various state, regional, and national competitions sanctioned by United States Adult Soccer Association (USASA).

One team competes in USL League Two, one of two fourth-tier soccer league in the United States, within the Metropolitan Division of the Eastern Conference. It formerly competed in the National Premier Soccer League between 2016 and 2019. The organization also field's a women's team in the Eastern Conference of United Women's Soccer (UWS).

USL League Two team 

New Jersey Copa FC finished 2nd in the NPSL's Keystone Conference in 2016 and reached the regional semifinals with a 1–0 win over defending National Champions New York Cosmos B. The team fell to eventual National semifinalist Clarkstown SC Eagles, 0–2, in the next round.

The team qualified via an at-large bid for the U.S. Open Cup tournament in 2017 based on its 2016 league results. In the first round, the team fell to local qualifier FC Motown, 2–0, at home.

Year by year

United Women's Soccer team 

New Jersey Copa FC Women's Team reached the inaugural 2016 UWS National Championship, hosted in California, in their first year competing in the league, where they eventually fell to Santa Clarita Blue Heat 1–2 in double-overtime.

The UWS is the second-tier of professional women's soccer in the United States, below the NWSL.

Year by year

References

External links 
 Official site

Metuchen, New Jersey
National Premier Soccer League teams
USL League Two teams
United Women's Soccer teams
Women's soccer clubs in New Jersey
2004 establishments in New Jersey
Association football clubs established in 2004